No. 215 Advanced Flying School RAF was a flying school of the Royal Air Force which was disbanded in 1954 at RAF Finningley.

Previous identities
 No. 11 Flying Training School RAF
 No. 11 Service Flying Training School RAF
 No. 11 (Pilots) Advanced Flying Unit RAF
 No. 21 (Pilots) Advanced Flying Unit RAF - merged with No. 1 Refresher School RAF
 No. 1 (Pilots) Refresher Flying Unit RAF
 Flying Refresher School RAF
 No. 101 Flying Refresher School RAF
 No. 215 Advanced Flying School RAF

References

Citations

Bibliography

Flying training schools of the RAF